Louis Julien Demers (December 9, 1848 – April 29, 1905) was a merchant and political figure in Quebec. He represented Lévis in the House of Commons of Canada from 1899 to 1905 as a Liberal.

He was born in St-Romuald, Canada East, the son of Benjamin Demers and Felicite Carrier, and was educated at the Collège de Lévis. In 1883, he married Elmina Giroux. Demers was first elected to the House of Commons in an 1899 by-election held after the death of Pierre Malcom Guay. He died in office at St-Romuald at the age of 56 after a long illness.

Electoral record

References 

Members of the House of Commons of Canada from Quebec
Liberal Party of Canada MPs
1848 births
1905 deaths